UNESCO Nadezhda K. Krupskaya literacy prize' was named after Russian politician of the Soviet era Nadezhda K. Krupskaya. The prize was sponsored by the government of the Soviet Union in the period 1970-1992.

List of Winners and Honourable Mentions

See also
UNESCO Confucius Prize for Literacy, China
UNESCO King Sejong Literacy Prize, South Korea
Noma Literacy Prize

References

UNESCO awards
Literacy-related awards
Education in the Soviet Union
Soviet awards